Concerto for Coloratura Soprano, Op. 82 is a 1943 concerto by Russian composer Reinhold Glière.

References

Concertos
Soprano arias
1943 compositions
Compositions by Reinhold Glière